The 1969–70 New Mexico State Aggies men's basketball team represented New Mexico State University during the 1969–70 NCAA University Division men's basketball season. The Aggies were independent and not a member of a conference. They were led by fourth year head coach Lou Henson and three future NBA players – consensus second-team All-American Jimmy Collins, big man Sam Lacey, and Charlie Criss. The team reached the Final Four of the NCAA tournament, losing to eventual champion UCLA before defeating St. Bonaventure in the national third-place game. To date, it is the only Final Four appearance in program history. The Aggies had three win streaks of at least eight games during the season and finished with a 27–3 record.

Roster

Schedule/results

|-
!colspan=9 style=| Regular Season

|-
!colspan=9 style=| NCAA Tournament

Rankings

Awards and honors
Jimmy Collins – Consensus Second-Team All-American

Team players in the 1970 NBA Draft

References

New Mexico State
New Mexico State Aggies men's basketball seasons
NCAA Division I men's basketball tournament Final Four seasons
New Mexico State